David Kent Pecaut,  (September 14, 1955 – December 14, 2009) was a US-born Canadian civic leader. He co-founded and sat on the board of the Toronto City Summit Alliance.

Personal life 
Pecaut was born to Richard and Dorothy (Kent) Pecaut and was raised in Sioux City, Iowa. He attended West High School before going to Harvard University (BA Sociology 1977) and University of Sussex (MA Philosophy 1978). He returned to Sioux City to work for Terra Chemicals before moving to Toronto in the 1980s.

Pecaut was appointed a member of the Order of Canada in November 2009. He died on December 14, 2009 at his Toronto residence due to colorectal cancer. He was 54 years old and survived by his wife Helen Burstyn and their daughters Lauren Burstyn Lawrence and her husband Matt, of Los Angeles, CA; Amy Burstyn, Sarah Pecaut and Rebecca Pecaut of Toronto; a brother Dan Pecaut and his wife Kay, of Sioux City, Iowa; a sister Stacey Gerhart of Sioux City, Iowa; a sister Mary Pecaut and her husband Youssouf Abdel-Jelil, living in Morocco; brother-in-law Rubin Burstyn and wife Judi Bodnoff; and their nieces, nephews and extended family members.

Professional life 
Pecaut began his consulting career as special assistant to the president of Terra Chemicals in Sioux City. He moved to Toronto and joined the Canada Consulting Group (CCG) in the early 1980s and became a partner at Telesis in Rhode Island in 1984. He rejoined CCG in 1988, later leading the negotiations that merged the firm with the Boston Consulting Group (BCG) in 1993 and found BCG Canada.

As a senior partner and managing director of BCG, he helped in building BCG's global strategy, e-commerce and public policy practices. David was an avid supporter of Toronto and devoted himself increasingly to civic entrepreneurship in recent years, referring to his city-building activities as one of the greatest highlights of his life.

Pecaut drove the creation of what is now the LEAP Pecaut Centre for Social Impact, making BCG Canada a co-founder along with EY, Google, McCarthy Tétrault, The Offord Group and H+K Strategies.

He spearheaded the formation of the Toronto City Summit Alliance in 2002 and was its guiding light in developing initiatives like DiverseCity, the Emerging Leaders Network, the Toronto Region Research Alliance, Greening Greater Toronto and Modernizing Income Security for Working Age Adults (MISWAA). He also convened the Toronto Alliance in 2003 to renew tourism after SARS, sparked the formation of the Toronto Region Immigrant Employment Council (TRIEC) and initiated an award winning mentorship partnership program. One of the civic projects that excited him most was Luminato, the Toronto-based international arts festival that he co-founded with Tony Gagliano in 2007. In 1996, David also had the vision to create Career Edge Organization which helps university and college graduates, people with disabilities and newcomers to Canada overcome various barriers to launching their careers through a paid internship program.

Legacy 
Pecaut Square, originally Metro Square, is a public space located between Metro Hall and Roy Thomson Hall in Toronto. It was renamed after David Pecaut by a unanimous Toronto City Council vote in April 2011.

See also
 Jane Jacobs
 Greening Greater Toronto
 Luminato
 Boston Consulting Group

References

External links
 In death, David Pecaut sets out a challenge for all Torontonians

1955 births
2009 deaths
American emigrants to Canada
People from Sioux City, Iowa
Deaths from cancer in Ontario
Harvard University alumni
Alumni of the University of Sussex
Deaths from colorectal cancer
Members of the Order of Canada
People from Toronto
Urban theorists